Yar Ali (also Romanized as Yār ‘Alī) is a village in Razan Rural District, Zagheh District, Khorramabad County, Lorestan Province, Iran. At the 2006 census, its population was 143, in 28 families.

References 

Towns and villages in Khorramabad County